Tamás Major (26 January 1910 – 13 April 1986) was a Hungarian stage and film actor. He also acted as the director of the Hungarian National Theatre from 1945 to 1962.

Selected filmography

 A szüz és a gödölye (1941) - István, Huber fiatalabb fia
 Különös házasság (1951) - Jezsuita
 Erkel (1952) - Kölcsey Ferenc
 Merénylet (1960) - Halmágyi
 Az utolsó vacsora (1962)
 Miért rosszak a magyar filmek? (1964) - Póczik
 Világos feladja (1964) - Mr. Borowski
 Az Életbe táncoltatott leány (1964) - A képmutogató
 Mit csinált Felséged 3-tól 5-ig? (1964) - Narrator
 Kár a benzinért (1965) - Igazgató
 A köszívü ember fiai (1965) - Baradlay Kázmér
 The Corporal and the Others (1965) - Albert
 Nem (1965) - Lakásügyi elõadó
 Minden kezdet nehéz (1966)
 Hideg napok (1966) - Grassy ezredes
 És akkor a pasas... (1966) - Xandor
 Egy magyar nábob (1966) - Griffard
 Sellö a pecsétgyürün I (1967) - Vöröskõy
 Változó felhözet (1967) - Felügyelõ
 Jaguár (1967) - Általános bácsi
 A múmia közbeszól (1967) - Fáraó
 Egy szerelem három éjszakája (1967) - Lajos, fõpincér
 Falak (1968) - Fõszerkesztõ
 Stars of Eger (1968) - I. Suleiman szultán
 Az oroszlán ugrani készül (1969) - Kálmán
 Alfa Romeó és Júlia (1969) - Bekötött fejû beteg
 Those Who Wear Glasses (1969) - Náray
 Utazás a koponyám körül (1970) - A bajuszos levantei
 Ítélet (1970) - Werbõczy
 Szerelmi álmok – Liszt (1970) - IX. Pius pápa
 A gyilkos a házban van (1971) - A házmester
 Trotta (1971) - Herr Reisiger
 Volt egyszer egy család (1972) - Kulkai házmester
 A magyar ugaron (1973) - Pap
 Football of the Good Old Days (1973) - Kerényi úr
 Végül (1974) - Nagyapa a parkban
 The Pendragon Legend (1974) - James Morvin
 Ereszd el a szakállamat! (1975) - Maracskó
 Mrs. Dery Where Are You? (1975) - Jancsó, öreg színész
 Hugo the Hippo (1975) - Aban-Khan (Hungarian version) (voice)
 Zongora a levegöben (1976) - Klimperberger, karmester
 Teketória (1977) - Zongorista
 Szabadíts meg a gonosztól (1979) - Igazgató úr
 Ajándék ez a nap (1979) - László László
 Circus maximus (1980) - Bárdos
 Mephisto (1981) - Oskar Kroge, színigazgató
 Ripacsok (1981) - Dr. Molnár Géza, elmeorvos
 Szerencsés Dániel (1983) - Dani's grandpa
 Elveszett illúziók (1983) - Rétfalvi
 A csoda vége (1984) - Péter
 Hanyatt-homlok (1984) - Nagyapa
 Colonel Redl (1985) - Baron Kubinyi
 Csak egy mozi (1985) - Oborzil - öreg színész
 Elsö kétszáz évem (1986) - Epstein
 A nagy generáció (1986) - Grandfather (final film role)

Bibliography
 Eby, Cecil D. Hungary at War: Civilians and Soldiers in World War II. Penn State Press, 2007.

External links 
 

1910 births
1986 deaths
Male actors from Budapest
People from the Kingdom of Hungary
Hungarian Communist Party politicians
Members of the Hungarian Working People's Party
Members of the Hungarian Socialist Workers' Party
Members of the National Assembly of Hungary (1949–1953)
Members of the National Assembly of Hungary (1958–1963)
Members of the National Assembly of Hungary (1963–1967)
Members of the National Assembly of Hungary (1967–1971)
Hungarian male film actors
Hungarian male stage actors
Hungarian male television actors
20th-century Hungarian male actors